Obi-Wan Kenobi: The Patterson Cut is a fan edit of the 2022 Star Wars TV series, Obi-Wan Kenobi, in which the six episodes are condensed into a two and a half hour feature film. Filmmaker Kai Patterson's, creator of the edit, aim was to address "fluff," fix quote, "some of the ordering to some of the scenes just to make them more effective or impactful," "awkward pacing, whole scenes that ultimately amounted to nothing, goofy dialogue and directing choices," and Moses Ingram's character, Reva, to make her "more menacing."

Patterson has stated the edit is his quote, "own artistic interpretation of how these scenes could be strung together to make something that works better for me personally." He has also stated that he was not trying to undermine the work of the original creators in creating the edit.

Reactions to the edit have been positive overall from critics and audiences. with some mixed responses.

Background

The show itself originally began development as a trilogy of films before transforming into a television series after the mixed reception and poor box office performance of 2018's Solo: A Star Wars Story. Because of this, Variety and Complex.com wrote that Patterson's edit "brings the project back to its origins." Screen Rant called it, "a glimpse at what could have been."

Despite the show receiving overall positive responses from critics and audiences, some fans took issue with the "filler," writing, pacing, a "weaker" middle half, questioning if it negated established Star Wars canon, and if development hell affected the final product.

Production
In a TikTok video, Patterson presented the statement, "The Obi-Wan Kenobi series should've been a movie, and I have proof."

He cut out most of the footage from episodes one, four, and six, including but not limited to the scene where Leia insults her cousin (but retains the following scene where her father tells her to apologize), the widely panned scene in which Leia is chased by bounty hunters in a forest, and the subplot where Reva attacks the Lars' homestead.

Patterson restructured certain segments, such as the introduction of the character Nari was moved to where he encounters Obi-Wan in the desert before the scene where the Inquisitors arrive on Tatooine.

Patterson also produced new shots, including one where a Stormtrooper asks Darth Vader for instructions was made within Blender and pieces of James Earl Jones' archive audio as Vader.

Release
Patterson released the edit onto his website, but was removed from Google search results. Instead of instant access, viewers would need to have an account to view it. The purpose of this was to quote, "do our best to keep this edit out of the hands of movie pirates."

Reception
Stephen M. Colbert of Screen Rant listed five ways how the edit was better than the series in their opinion, from the story putting a bigger emphasis on the title character, Reva having a "more impactful" arc, the new music, the redone pacing, and the changes done to Darth Vader. Cooper Hood (also of Screen Rant) called the edit, "fairly impressive." Raul Velasquez of GameRant said, "The [edit] gives [the series] a professional trim many Star Wars fans might have wanted from Disney in the first place." Cinemanía said (translated from Spanish), "the result is much better," and "Faced with such laudable work, any Jedi (or aspiring Jedi) would recognize that the Force is more powerful at hobbyist workbenches than it is in executive offices." Jonas Mäki of Gamereactor said, "It's well worth checking out…" YouTuber and critic John Campea described it as "fantastic," going on to say, "And by 'fantastic,' I mean the improvement over the show as it aired on Disney+. It doesn't make it the best Star Wars show I've ever seen, but the improvement is undeniable." Kate Harrold of GamingBible said, "[It] has its own issues, but it certainly provides for a compelling experience and is definitely worth checking out."

Michael Green of Digital Trends gave the edit a mixed review. He praised Patterson's edits to the content of episodes one, four, and six, which he calls as "the three weakest." He goes on to praise the removal of Reva's attack upon the Lars' homestead, saying, "This makes the final battle between Obi-Wan and Anakin more impactful… Patterson shows that the better choice here is to let the duel build without interruption to its emotional climax," and the utilization of John Williams' music from previous Star Wars films, particularly "Duel of the Fates". However, Green criticizes the first twenty-five minutes, calling it, "truncated and choppy without sufficient setup and exposition," citing the omission of scenes in which Leia insults her cousin, and retaining of the following scene where Bail Organa tells her to apologize. Green also called the reorganization of Nari's scenes, "a very awkward transition, [because] the viewer has no idea who Nari is, or what his motivation is…," called not entirely omitting episode four, "probably Patterson's biggest mistake," and the transition from episode five to six.

Citing comments from news website The Adventures of Vesper and fans on Twitter, Paul Speed of Mirror.co.uk said, "many fans agree that this new fan-version has made [the show] a more enjoyable and cohesive story, though some noted there are certain edits that make it all feel a bit rushed."

Legality
Due to the nature of the edit being a derivative of a copyrighted work, Patterson is not profiting from the edit, and urges potential viewers to own a Disney+ subscription before viewing, stating, "Let's make sure we're supporting all the original artists on this show by not letting this become a means of pirating."

See also
 The Phantom Edit, a fan edit of Star Wars: Episode I – The Phantom Menace

References

Further reading

External links
 
 
 
 Local Filmmaker Kai Patterson on his viral re-mix of Obi-Wan Kenobi - The Patterson Cut - (video) via KITV

2022 films
2022 independent films
Fan films based on Star Wars
Alternative versions of films
Unofficial adaptations
2020s American films